Corydoras garbei is a species of catfish in the family Callichthyidae endemic to Brazil where it is found in the São Francisco River basin.  It is sold as an aquarium fish.

References
 

Corydoras
Fish of the São Francisco River basin
Taxa named by Rodolpho von Ihering
Endemic fauna of Brazil
Fish described in 1911